The Agua Caliente Cultural Museum is a culture and history museum located in Palm Springs, California, United States, focusing on the Cahuilla people of the Coachella Valley.

History
The museum was established in 1991.

Exhibits

Collections
Among the collections of the museum are:
 Off-site Exhibitions – the museum sponsors exhibits at various institutions. Presently exhibits are at:
 Spa Resort Casino Hotel Lobby (Palm Springs) on the spiritual Wahaatukicnikic Tetayaw (Blue Frog) living at the Agua Caliente Hot Spring
 California State University San Bernardino, Palm Desert Campus about Native Americans competing in sports
 Palm Springs City Hall, showing major milestones and events of Cahuilla people history
 Core exhibitions
 Cahuilla Culture and History
 The Florence Patencio Collection, about a significant cultural leader of the community
 Online exhibitions
 Featured exhibitions

Operations

Ownership
The Agua Caliente Band of Cahuilla Indians sponsors the museum.

Location
The museum is located at 140 North Indian Canyon Drive (downtown Palm Springs) between Andreas Road and Tahquitz Canyon Way. Public transportation via SunLine Transit is available on lines 111, 30 and 14. Administrative offices and a 1,200 volume reference library are at 901 East Tahquitz Canyon Way, Suite C-204, Palm Springs, CA 92262.

Publications
 The Spirit

Affiliations
The museum is the first Native American museum to be part of the Smithsonian Institution Affiliations Program.

Activities and recognition
The museum participates in the American Alliance of Museums (AAM) Museum Assessment Program; and it received a first-place award in the AAM 2010 Publications Design Competition for its 2009–2010 Museum Program Brochure and Program Announcement Cards (designed by JCRR Design).

It also collaborates with the UCLA/Getty's Masters Program.

Future plans
The museum is fundraising for expansion into a 100,000 square foot facility designed by architects Jones & Jones.

References

Further reading
 
  (here for Table of Contents)

External links
 Aqua Caliente Cultural Museum – official site 
 Online Archive of California – Aqua Caliente Cultural Museum
 Agua Caliente Band of Cahuilla Indians: Cultural History
 Museums USA.org Agua Caliente Cultural Museum
 Organizational Profile – National Center for Charitable Statistics (Urban Institute)

American West museums in California
Buildings and structures in Palm Springs, California
Tourist attractions in Palm Springs, California
Landmarks of Riverside County, California
Museums in Riverside County, California
Cahuilla
Museum
Native American museums in California
1991 establishments in California
Museums established in 1991